Flavius Theodosius (died 376), also known as Count Theodosius or Theodosius the Elder, was a senior military officer serving Valentinian I and the western Roman empire during Late Antiquity. Under his command the Roman army defeated numerous threats, incursions, and usurpations. Theodosius was patriarch of the imperial Theodosian dynasty and father of the emperor Theodosius the Great.

He was granted the title of comes rei militaris per Britanniarum (Commander of the Troops of the Diocese of the Britains) by the emperor Valentinian for his work there; putting down the Great Conspiracy (367–368) and the usurpation of Valentinus. After restoring order in Britain he returned to continental Europe and fought against the Alemanni; as Valentinian's magister equitum (Master of Horse) he successfully invaded Alemannic territory (371 or 370). In 372 Theodosius led a successful campaign against the Sarmatians. In the same year Firmus, a Mauritanian prince, rebelled against Roman rule. Theodosius was sent to Africa and in two hard-fought campaigns (373–374) put down the insurrection. In 376, after the death of emperor Valentinian, he was arrested and executed, presumably as he was seen as a threat to the new western emperors Gratian and Valentinian II.

Military career
Theodosius is first mentioned in historical records by Ammianus Marcellinus with reference to his appointment to the command to restore order in Britain. It is clear that prior to his appointment to such an important military command Theodosius must have been a confidant of Valentinian and that his military ability was known and respected, but unfortunately what his career up to that point was is unknown.

The Great Conspiracy

In 368, Theodosius was raised to the high Roman military rank of comes rei militaris and sent to northern Gaul and Britannia to recover the lands lost to the Great Barbarian Conspiracy in the previous year. Theodosius was given command of part of Valentinian's comitatensis (the Imperial Field Army) and early in the year he marched on Bononia (Boulogne-sur-Mer), Rome's harbour on the Channel. Taking advantage of a break in the weather Theodosius crossed the Channel, landing at Rutupiae (Richborough), leaving the bulk of his troops in Bononia to await clearer weather. At Rutupiae Theodosius started gathering intelligence on the situation in Britain; he found out that the troops in Britain had either refused to fight against an enemy superior in numbers, or had been on furlough when the invasion began. Furthermore, he found out that the enemy had broken up their forces into small raiding parties which were plundering at will. When his army finally crossed the Channel with the onset of clear, spring, weather, Theodosius had made his plans and was ready to move. The Roman army marched on Londinium (London) and re-established Imperial control of Britain's largest city. Londinium would act as Theodosius' base of operations. He divided his army into detachments and sent them to attack the marauding warbands within reach of the city. The Romans quickly overcame the small enemy raiding parties, killing and/or capturing many marauders, and relieving them of their booty, supplies and prisoners. Theodosius also sent messengers offering pardon to deserters and ordering them to make their way to Londinium.

Over the winter of 368–369, large numbers of troops started drifting back into their units, bringing vital intelligence that would help Theodosius plan the next phase of his campaign. In 369 Theodosius campaigned all through Roman Britain, restoring its 'chief towns' and hunting down enemy war parties and traitors. Ammianus Marcellinus records that he put down a rebellion by the Pannonian Valentinus. At the end of the campaigning season he sent a message to Valentinian to inform him that the provinces of Britain had been restored to the Empire. He also informed the emperor that he had created a new province which he had named Valentia (probably for Valentinian).

Known to have been with him on this expedition were his younger son, the later emperor, Theodosius and the future usurper Magnus Maximus.

Magister Equitum Praesentalis
On his return from Britain Theodosius succeeded Jovinus as the magister equitum praesentalis at the court of Emperor Valentinian I, in which capacity he prosecuted another successful campaign (370/371) against the Alemanni. In 372 Theodosius was deployed to Illyricum and led an army against the Sarmatians; he appears to have secured a victory in battle and successfully brought the campaign against to an end.

In 372 Firmus, a Mauretanian prince, rebelled against Roman rule and plunged the Diocese of Africa into disarray. Valentinian decided to give the command of the expedition to suppress the rebellion to Theodosius. The army was reorganized, extra troops were recruited, Theodosius' son was made dux Moesiae Primae replacing his father as commander in Illyricum and Theodosius himself started mustering his troops at Arles.  In the spring of 373 Theodosius sailed to Africa and led a successful campaign against the rebels in the east of Mauritania. At the end of the campaigning season, when he led his army into western Mauritania, he suffered a major setback. In 374 Theodosius invaded western Mauritania again. This time he was more successful, defeating the rebels and capturing Firmus. In 373/374, the younger Theodosius was made dux of the province of Moesia Prima.

In 375, when Emperor Valentinian suddenly died, Theodosius was still in Africa. Orders arrived for Theodosius to be arrested; he was taken to Carthage, and put to death in early 376. The reasons for this are not clear, but it is thought to have resulted from a factional power struggle in Italy after the sudden death of Emperor Valentinian in November 375. Shortly before his death Count Theodosius accepted Christian baptism — a common practice at the time, even for lifelong Christians.

Family 
According to Polemius Silvius, Theodosius the Elder's son, Theodosius the Great, was born on 11 January 347 or 346. The epitome de Caesaribus places his birthplace at Cauca (Coca, Segovia) in Hispania. Theodosius had another son named Honorius, a daughter referred to in Aurelius Victor's De caesaribus but whose name is unknown, and a grand-niece, Serena.

Legacy
At the fall of his father, Theodosius the dux of Moesia Prima retired to his estates in the Iberian Peninsula, where he married Aelia Flaccilla in 376. Their first child, Arcadius, was born around 377. Pulcheria, their daughter, was born in 377 or 378. Theodosius had returned to the Danube frontier by 378, when he was appointed magister equitum. following his successes in the field  elevated at Sirmium (Sremska Mitrovica) to the rank of augustus by the emperor Gratian on 19 January 379.

The younger Theodosius, who himself married into the ruling Valentinianic dynasty by wedding Galla, the sister of Theodosius's co-augustus Gratian and the daughter of Valentinian the Great and his second wife Justina, went on to establish his as an imperial dynasty, making Count Theodosius the progenitor and patriarch of a line of Roman emperors and empresses.

See also
Roman Britain

References

Ancient Sources
 Ammianus Marcellinus. Rerum gestarum Libri XXXI [31 Books of Deeds].  AD 391.  Translated by Charles Yonge. Roman History, Vol. XXVIII, Ch. III. Bohn (London), 1862. Hosted at Wikisource.

Modern Sources
 A.H.M. Jones, et al. Prosopography of the Later Roman Empire.
 
 
 Medieval Lands Project: Count Flavius Theodosius the Elder

376 deaths
4th-century Christians
4th-century Romans
Ancient Romans in Britain
Comites rei militaris
Converts to Christianity from pagan religions
Generals of Valentinian I
Magistri equitum (Roman Empire)
Theodosian dynasty
Year of birth unknown